One Flew Over the Cuckoo's Nest is a 1975 American psychological comedy drama film directed by Miloš Forman, based on the 1962 novel of the same name by Ken Kesey. The film stars Jack Nicholson who plays a new patient at a  mental institution alongside Louise Fletcher who plays an austere nurse. It also features a supporting cast of Will Sampson, Danny DeVito, Sydney Lassick, William Redfield, as well as Christopher Lloyd and Brad Dourif in their film debuts.

Filming began in January 1975 and lasted three months, taking place on location in Salem, Oregon, and the surrounding area, as well as Depoe Bay on the north Oregon coast. The producers decided to shoot the film in the Oregon State Hospital, an actual mental hospital, as this was also the setting of the novel. The hospital is still in operation (as of 2022), though the original buildings seen in the film have been demolished. The film released on November 19, 1975. Considered by many to be one of the greatest films ever made, One Flew Over the Cuckoo's Nest is No. 33 on the American Film Institute's 100 Years... 100 Movies list.

The film was the second to win all five major Academy Awards (Best Picture, Actor in Lead Role, Actress in Lead Role, Director, and Screenplay) following It Happened One Night in 1934, an accomplishment not repeated until 1991 with The Silence of the Lambs. It also won numerous Golden Globe and BAFTA Awards. In 1993, the film was deemed "culturally, historically, or aesthetically significant" by the United States Library of Congress, and selected for preservation in the National Film Registry.

Plot
In the autumn of 1963, Randle McMurphy is on an Oregon work farm for the statutory rape of a 15-year-old girl. He pretends to be insane in order to get himself transferred to a mental institution and avoid hard labor. The ward is dominated by head nurse Mildred Ratched, a cold, passive-aggressive tyrant who intimidates her patients.

The other patients include young, anxious, stuttering Billy Bibbit; Charlie Cheswick, who is prone to temper tantrums; delusional, child-like Martini; the articulate, repressed homosexual Dale Harding; belligerent and profane Max Taber; epileptics Jim Sefelt and Bruce Fredrickson; quiet but violent-minded Scanlon; tall, deaf-mute Native American "Chief" Bromden; and several others with chronic conditions.

Ratched sees McMurphy's lively, rebellious presence as a threat to her authority, which she responds to by confiscating and rationing the patients' cigarettes and suspending their card-playing privileges. McMurphy finds himself in a battle of wills against Ratched. He steals a school bus, escaping with several patients to go fishing on the Pacific Coast and encouraging them to discover their own abilities and find self-confidence.

After an orderly tells him that the judge's sentence does not apply to people who are deemed to be criminally insane, McMurphy makes plans to escape, encouraging Chief Bromden to throw a hydrotherapy console through a window. It is also revealed that McMurphy, Chief and Taber are the only non-chronic patients involuntarily committed to the institution; the rest of them are self-committed and could leave at any time, but are too afraid to do so. After Cheswick bursts into a fit and demands his cigarettes, which had been rationed by Ratched, McMurphy fights with the orderlies, and Chief intervenes.

Ratched sends Chief, Cheswick, and McMurphy to the "shock shop" as a result of this insubordination. While awaiting their punishment, McMurphy offers Chief a stick of gum, and discovers he can speak and hear, having feigned his deaf-muteness to avoid engaging with anyone. After being subjected to electroconvulsive therapy, McMurphy returns to the ward pretending to be brain damaged, but then reveals that the treatment has made him even more determined to defeat Ratched. McMurphy and Chief make plans to escape, but decide to throw a secret Christmas party for their friends after Ratched and the orderlies leave for the night.

McMurphy sneaks two prostitutes, Candy and Rose, and bottles of alcohol into the ward; he bribes guard Turkle to allow this. After the party, McMurphy and Chief prepare to escape, inviting Billy to come with them. Billy refuses, but asks for a "date" with Candy; McMurphy arranges for him to have sex with her. McMurphy and the others get drunk, and McMurphy falls asleep instead of making his escape with Chief.

Ratched arrives in the morning to find the ward in disarray and most of the patients passed out. She discovers Billy and Candy together, and aims to embarrass Billy in front of everyone. Billy manages to overcome his stutter and stands up to Ratched. When she threatens to tell his mother, Billy cracks under the pressure and reverts to stuttering. Ratched has him placed in the doctor's office. Moments later, McMurphy punches an orderly when trying to escape out of a window with the Chief, causing the other orderlies to intervene. Meanwhile, Billy commits suicide by slitting his throat with broken glass. Ratched tries to ease the situation by calling for the day's routine to continue as usual, and an enraged McMurphy strangles Ratched. The orderlies subdue McMurphy, saving Ratched's life.

Some time later, Ratched is wearing a neck brace and speaking with a weak voice, and Harding now leads the now-unsuspended card-playing. McMurphy is nowhere to be found, leading to rumors that he has escaped. Later that night, Chief sees McMurphy being returned to his bed. He greets him, elated that McMurphy had kept his promise not to escape without him, but notices McMurphy is unresponsive and physically limp, and discovers lobotomy scars on his forehead. Chief tearfully hugs McMurphy and says, "You're coming with me," before smothering him to death with a pillow. He then lifts the hydrotherapy console off the floor, smashes it through the window gates, and escapes alone (thus being the “one” who “flew over the cuckoo’s nest”), all while the remaining inmates, having been woken up by the glass breaking noise, watch and cheer him on.

Cast

Production

The title comes from a nursery rhyme read to Chief Bromden as a child by his grandmother, mentioned in the book:
Vintery, mintery, cutery, corn,
Apple seed and apple thorn,
Wire, briar, limber lock
Three geese in a flock
One flew East
One flew West
And one flew over the cuckoo's nest.

Actor Kirk Douglas—who had originated the role of McMurphy in the 1963–64 Broadway stage version of the Ken Kesey novel—had purchased the film rights to the story, and tried for a decade to bring it to the big screen, but was unable to find a studio willing to make it with him. Eventually, he sold the rights to his son Michael Douglas, who succeeded in getting the film produced—but the elder Douglas, by then nearly 60, was considered too old for the McMurphy role, Gene Hackman, James Caan, Marlon Brando, and Burt Reynolds were also considered, but all four turned down the role, which ultimately went to 37-year-old Jack Nicholson. Douglas brought in Saul Zaentz as co-producer.

The film's first screenwriter, Lawrence Hauben, introduced Douglas to the work of Miloš Forman, whose 1967 Czechoslovak film The Firemen's Ball had certain qualities that mirrored the goals of the present script. Forman flew to California and discussed the script page by page, outlining what he would do, in contrast with other directors who had been approached who were less than forthcoming. Forman wrote in 2012: "To me, [the story] was not just literature, but real life, the life I lived in Czechoslovakia from my birth in 1932 until 1968. The Communist Party was my Nurse Ratched, telling me what I could and could not do; what I was or was not allowed to say; where I was and was not allowed to go; even who I was and was not".

Zaentz, a voracious reader, felt an affinity with Kesey, and so after Hauben's first attempt he asked Kesey to write the screenplay. Kesey participated in the early stages of script development, but withdrew after creative differences with the producers over casting and narrative point of view; ultimately he filed suit against the production and won a settlement.

Hal Ashby, who had been an early consideration for director, suggested Jack Nicholson for the role of McMurphy. Nicholson had never played this type of role before. Production was delayed for about six months because of Nicholson's schedule. Douglas later stated in an interview that "that turned out to be a great blessing: it gave us the chance to get the ensemble right".

Casting
Danny DeVito was the first to be cast, reprising his role as the patient Martini from the 1971 off-Broadway production. Chief Bromden (who turns out to be the title character), played by Will Sampson, was found through the referral of Mel Lambert (who portrayed the harbormaster in the fishing scene), a used car dealer Douglas met on an airplane flight when Douglas told him they wanted a "big guy" to play the part. Lambert's father often sold cars to Native American customers and six months later called Douglas to say: "the biggest sonofabitch Indian came in the other day!"

Bud Cort was considered for the role of Billy Bibbit.

Miloš Forman had considered Shelley Duvall for the role of Candy; coincidentally, she, Nicholson, and Scatman Crothers (who portrays Turkle) would all later appear as part of the main cast of the 1980 film adaptation of The Shining. While screening Thieves Like Us (1974) to see if she was right for the role, he became interested in Louise Fletcher, who had a supporting role, for the role of Nurse Ratched. A mutual acquaintance, the casting director Fred Roos, had already mentioned Fletcher's name as a possibility. Even so, it took four or five meetings, over a year, (during which the role was offered to other actresses such as Jeanne Moreau, Colleen Dewhurst, Ellen Burstyn, Angela Lansbury, Anne Bancroft, and Geraldine Page) for Fletcher to secure the role of Nurse Ratched. Her final audition was late in 1974, with Forman, Zaentz, and Douglas. The day after Christmas, her agent called to say she was expected at the Oregon State Hospital in Salem on January 4 to begin rehearsals.

In 2016, Fletcher recalled that Nicholson's salary was "enormous", while the rest of the cast worked at or close to scale. She put in 11 weeks, earning $10,000 before taxes.

Rehearsals
Prior to commencement of filming, a week of rehearsals started on January 4, 1975, in Oregon, during which the actors watched the patients in their daily routine and at group therapy. Jack Nicholson and Louise Fletcher also witnessed electroconvulsive therapy being performed on a patient.

Filming
Filming began in January 1975, and concluded approximately three months later, and was shot on location in Salem, Oregon, and the surrounding area, as well as the coastal town of Depoe Bay, Oregon.

The producers decided to shoot the film in the Oregon State Hospital, an actual mental hospital, as this was also the setting of the novel. The hospital's director, Dean Brooks, was supportive of the filming and eventually ended up playing the character of Dr. John Spivey in the film. Brooks identified a patient for each of the actors to shadow, and some of the cast even slept on the wards at night. He also wanted to incorporate his patients into the crew, to which the producers agreed. Douglas recalls that it was not until later that he found out that many of them were criminally insane.

As Forman did not allow the actors to see the day's filming, this led to the cast losing confidence in him, while Nicholson also began to wonder about his performance. Douglas convinced Forman to show Nicholson something, which he did, and restored the actor's confidence.

Haskell Wexler was fired as cinematographer and replaced by Bill Butler. Wexler believed his dismissal was due to his concurrent work on the documentary Underground, in which the radical militant group the Weather Underground were being interviewed while hiding from the law. However, Forman said he had terminated Wexler's services over artistic differences. Both Wexler and Butler received Academy Award nominations for Best Cinematography for One Flew Over the Cuckoo's Nest, though Wexler said there was "only about a minute or two minutes in that film I didn't shoot".

According to Butler, Nicholson refused to speak to Forman: "...[Jack] never talked to Miloš at all, he only talked to me".

The production went over the initial budget of $2 million and over-schedule, but Zaentz, who was personally financing the movie, was able to come up with the difference by borrowing against his company, Fantasy Records. The total production budget came to $4.4 million.

Release
The film premiered at the Sutton and Paramount Theatres in New York City on November 19, 1975. It was the second-highest-grossing film released in 1975 in the United States and Canada with a gross of $109 million, one of the seventh-highest-grossing films of all time at the time. As it was released toward the end of the year, most of its gross was in 1976 and was the highest-grosser for calendar year 1976 with rentals of $56.5 million.

Worldwide, One Flew Over the Cuckoo's Nest grossed $163,250,000. The picture was the highest-grossing film released
by UA up to that time.

Reception

Critics praised the film, sometimes with reservations. Roger Ebert said:  Ebert later put the film on his "Great Movies" list. A.D. Murphy of Variety wrote a mixed review as well, as did Vincent Canby in The New York Times: 

The film opened and closed with original music by composer Jack Nitzsche, featuring an eerie bowed saw (performed by Robert Armstrong) and wine glasses. On the score, reviewer Steven McDonald: 

The film won the "Big Five" Academy Awards at the 48th Oscar ceremony. These include the Best Actor for Jack Nicholson, Best Actress for Louise Fletcher, Best Direction for Forman, Best Picture, and Best Adapted Screenplay for Lawrence Hauben and Bo Goldman. The film has a 93% "Certified Fresh" rating at Rotten Tomatoes based on reviews from 115 critics, with an average rating of 9/10. The website's critics consensus reads: "Jack Nicholson and Louise Fletcher are worthy adversaries in One Flew Over the Cuckoo’s Nest, with Miloš Forman’s more grounded and morally ambiguous approach to Ken Kesey’s surrealistic novel yielding a film of outsized power."

Kesey himself claimed never to have seen the movie, but said he disliked what he knew of it, a fact confirmed by Chuck Palahniuk, who wrote: "The first time I heard this story, it was through the movie starring Jack Nicholson. A movie that Kesey once told me he disliked."

In 1993, the film was deemed "culturally, historically, or aesthetically significant" by the United States Library of Congress and selected for preservation in their National Film Registry.

The Japanese filmmaker Akira Kurosawa cited this movie as one of his 100 favorite films.

Popular culture
Pantera singer Phil Anselmo released a music video called Choosing Mental Illness with his band Philip H. Anselmo & The Illegals. It pays tribute to the film One Flew Over the Cuckoo's Nest. The music video shows scenes recreated from the film with Anselmo playing McMurphy and the rest of the band playing other characters from the film, and Nurse Ratched played by actor Michael St. Michaels.

Awards and nominations

In 2015, the film ranked 59th on BBC's "100 Greatest American Films" list, voted on by film critics from around the world.

American Film Institute
 AFI's 100 Years... 100 Movies – #20
 AFI's 100 Years... 100 Heroes and Villains:
 Nurse Ratched – #5 Villain
 R.P. McMurphy - Nominated Hero
 AFI's 100 Years... 100 Cheers – #17
 AFI's 100 Years... 100 Movies (10th Anniversary Edition) – #33

See also

 List of Academy Award records
 List of Big Five Academy Award winners and nominees
 Mental illness in film
 Ratched

Notes

References

External links

 
 
 
 
 

1975 films
1975 comedy-drama films
1970s American films
American comedy-drama films
American independent films
Best Film BAFTA Award winners
Best Picture Academy Award winners
Best Drama Picture Golden Globe winners
Films about nurses
Films about psychiatry
Films scored by Jack Nitzsche
Films based on American novels
Films directed by Miloš Forman
Films featuring a Best Actor Academy Award-winning performance
Films featuring a Best Actress Academy Award-winning performance
Films featuring a Best Drama Actor Golden Globe winning performance
Films featuring a Best Drama Actress Golden Globe-winning performance
Films produced by Michael Douglas
Films produced by Saul Zaentz
Films set in 1963
Films set in Oregon
Films set in psychiatric hospitals
Films shot in Oregon
Films whose director won the Best Directing Academy Award
Films whose director won the Best Direction BAFTA Award
Films whose director won the Best Director Golden Globe
Films whose writer won the Best Adapted Screenplay Academy Award
Films with screenplays by Bo Goldman
United Artists films
United States National Film Registry films
One Flew Over the Cuckoo's Nest
Psychiatry in the United States in fiction
Psychosurgery in fiction
1970s English-language films
Films about disability